Safe as Houses is the second full-length album from indie rock ensemble Parenthetical Girls. It was released on June 27, 2006 on Slender Means Society and April 27, 2007 on Acuarela Discos. It features album art by American artist Autumn Whitehurst.

Track listing
"Love Connection, Pt. II" - 5:16
"I Was the Dancer" - 4:42
"Oh Daughter/Disaster" - 4:01
"One Father, Another" - 3:16
"The Weight She Fell Under" - 3:09
"Survived by Her Mother" - 3:34
"Keyholes and Curtains" - 4:01
"Forward to Forget" - 2:45
"The Four Platitudes (A Bridge Song)" - 3:16
"Stolen Children" - 4:10

Personnel
 Zac Pennington – vocals, keyboards, glockenspiel, guitar
 Jherek Bischoff – percussion, violin, upright bass, bass guitar, clarinet, vocals
 Sam Mickens – guitar, synthesizer, piano, vocals

Parenthetical Girls albums
2006 albums
Slender Means Society albums